Martin E. Scheibner (October 13, 1842 – November 29, 1908) was a Russian Empire-born soldier who fought for the Union Army during the American Civil War. He received the Medal of Honor for valor.

Biography
Scheibner received the Medal of Honor in June 23, 1896 for his actions at the Battle of Mine Run, Virginia on November 27, 1863 while with Company G of the 90th Pennsylvania Infantry.

Medal of Honor citation

Citation:

The President of the United States of America, in the name of Congress, takes pleasure in presenting the Medal of Honor to Private Martin E. Scheibner, United States Army, for extraordinary heroism on 27 November 1863, while serving with Company G, 90th Pennsylvania Infantry, in action at Mine Run, Virginia. Private Scheibner voluntarily extinguished the burning fuse of a shell which had been thrown into the lines of the regiment by the enemy.

See also

List of American Civil War Medal of Honor recipients: Q–S

References

External links

1842 births
1908 deaths
Union Army soldiers
United States Army Medal of Honor recipients
American Civil War recipients of the Medal of Honor
Foreign-born Medal of Honor recipients
Emigrants from the Russian Empire to the United States